In molecular biology, the BsuBI/PstI restriction endonuclease family is a family of type II restriction endonucleases. It includes BsuBI and PstI. The enzymes of the BsuBI restriction/modification (R/M) system recognise the target sequence 5'CTGCAG and are functionally identical with those of the PstI R/M system.

References

Protein families